Hermes Junior Football Club are a Scottish football club from Bridge of Don, an area of the city of Aberdeen. Founded in 1968 by pupils of Robert Gordon's College, the club initially played at amateur level before becoming members of the Scottish Junior Football Association in 1993. They currently play in the SJFA North Superleague and their home ground is Lochside Park.

The club are so named after a founder member saw an advert in a magazine for a Hermes 2000 typewriter.

The club finished as champions in 2011–12 season, winning the SJFA North Region Superleague title for the first time. Hermes set a new SJFA Superleague points record of 73 points during the championship winning season, the previous record being held by Formartine United. Hermes were undefeated at home and only lost one game all season. The top goalscorer for the season was Marek Madle.

Honours
SJFA North Superleague champions: 2011–12, 2014–15
Runners-up: 2015–16, 2017–18
North (Norsco) Regional Cup: 1997–98, 2003–04
North East Division One winners: 1994–95
McLeman (Duthie) Cup: 2008–09
North Region Grill League Cup: 2003–04
Morrison Trophy: 1993–94, 1996–97

External links
Club website

References

Football clubs in Scotland
Scottish Junior Football Association clubs
Football clubs in Aberdeen
Association football clubs established in 1968
1968 establishments in Scotland